Dayo Wong Tze-wah (born 5 September 1960) is a Hong Kong comedian, actor and singer. Known as a pioneer of stand-up comedy in Hong Kong, he is known for his stadium shows integrating political satire and social commentary. He has performed at the Hong Kong Coliseum, including 26 sold-out shows at his farewell stand-up performance.

Biography
Wong gained a bachelor's degree in philosophy from the University of Alberta in Canada.

He began his career in the entertainment industry in Hong Kong in 1984, but he is best known for his works in live stand-up comedy which he started performing regularly since 1990. Since then he has starred in TV dramas and films and has recorded several albums.

Television 
Dayo had his TVB TV series debut in 1999, acting as "Lai Sam" in "Justice Sung 2". A year later, he reached a milestone as a lazy law firm assistant in War of the Genders, winning the "My Favourite Television Character Award" in 2002. He won two awards in 2004: the My Favourite On-Screen Partners (with Ada Choi in "Catch the Uncatchable") and again, the My Favourite Television Character Award (also in "Catch the Uncatchable").

He was nominated for the TV King Award in 2007 and 2009. He was finally crowned as TV King with "Bounty Lady" in 2013. To Dayo, the award was an accumulative result of his TVB dramas. In that year, Julian Cheung started as the clear favourite of the audience due to his popularity in "Triumph in the Skies 2". Though Chilam ended up winning the Most Popular Male Character, he sounded disappointed in his acceptance speech (the price is widely recognised as a consolation prize to The Best Actor Award). Chilam did not stay behind the ceremony for the TVB official interview. He explained that he was not informed to stay behind for any interview. The discord rumours between Chilam and Dayo begin to spread out widely. However, the rumour was shot down when Chilam surprised Dayo by his sudden appearance at a meal gathering of the Bounty Lady.

Stand-up 
Besides the TVB drama career, Dayo is also well known to be a stand-up comedian. He introduced stand-up comedy to Hong Kong and is well known for including a lot of political and philosophical content in his sets. "Hong Kong's housing issue is absolutely ridiculous. I have discussed this in my stand-up shows too. Hong Kong residents need to have 13 to 14 times their current annual salary to finally be qualified for home ownership." said the comedian. He has performed in Hong Kong, Australia, Canada, and the United States.

Film 
In comparison with his stand-up comedy and TV dramas, his movies are not as successful. When asked the reasons behind, he explained that his ultimate goal is to look for something new in his movies. His visions make his work good to watch, but it is not good enough to attract people to pay for a cinema ticket. Additionally, he hates doing promotion for his work.
However, this situation has changed recently with his last four movies namely, Agent Mr Chan (2018), The Grand Grandmaster (2020), Table for Six (2022) and A Guilty Conscience (2023) helping to break him out of the box-office poison moniker. Table for Six in particular, has become the most successful comedy release in Hong Kong and the second highest-grossing Chinese film in Hong Kong.

Filmography

Stand-up comedy, Free Man Show, Stage

Films

TV series

Discography
Album

Other albums

Not included in the albums

References

External links
Dayo Wong Website

1960 births
Living people
Hong Kong screenwriters
Hong Kong male television actors
Hong Kong male comedians
Hong Kong male singers
Cantopop singers
Hong Kong stand-up comedians
University of Alberta alumni
People from Sanshui District
TVB veteran actors
Hong Kong male film actors
Hong Kong radio presenters
Hong Kong television presenters
Hong Kong film producers
20th-century Hong Kong male actors
21st-century Hong Kong male actors